Sylvia Smit (born 4 July 1986) is a Dutch female footballer who plays as a midfielder and striker for DTS Ede in the Dutch Topklasse. She has played professional football for clubs in the Dutch Eredivisie Vrouwen and the Belgian-Dutch BeNe League. She also has over 100 appearances for the Netherlands women's national football team.

Club career
Smit career started at amateur clubs SETA (from Musselkanaal), SPW and SC Stadskanaal (both from Stadskanaal). In 2002 she joined Oranje Nassau, winning the KNVB Women's Cup (Dutch Cup) in the last of her three seasons at the club. She then joined Be Quick '28 in 2005 and was the top scorer of the Hoofdklasse. When the professional Dutch women's league (Eredivisie Vrouwen) was formed in 2007, she joined FC Twente for the league's inaugural season and won her second Dutch Cup at the club. In 2008 she joined SC Heerenveen and was the Eredivisie top scorer for two consecutive seasons (14 goals in 2008–09 and 11 goals in 2009–10).

She joined FC Zwolle in 2011 and when the Belgian and Dutch leagues merged creating the BeNe League, she played the inaugural season for the club (then renamed PEC Zwolle).

On 1 August 2014, she returned to SC Heerenveen and signed a one-year contract.

On 11 June 2015, it was announced she was joining DTS Ede in the Dutch Topklasse.

International career
On 6 August 2004 Smit debuted for the senior Netherlands women's national football team, playing the first half of a 2–0 friendly defeat to Japan in Zeist.

Smit also featured in the Dutch run to the semi-final of UEFA Women's Euro 2009, playing all of the Netherlands five matches in the tournament and scoring a goal.

On 25 November 2012, she earned her 100th cap for the national team in a friendly match against Wales at Velsen, scoring the first goal of the 2–0 Dutch win.

In June 2013 national team coach Roger Reijners selected Smit in his Netherlands squad for UEFA Women's Euro 2013 in Sweden.

International goals
Scores and results list the Netherlands goal tally first.

Honours
Oranje Nassau
 KNVB Women's Cup (1): 2004–05

FC Twente
 KNVB Women's Cup (1): 2007–08

DTS Ede
 Topklasse (1): 2015–16

References

External links
Smit profile on club website
Smit profile on women's Netherlands
Smit profile on UEFA.com

1986 births
Living people
People from Stadskanaal
Dutch women's footballers
Netherlands women's international footballers
Eredivisie (women) players
FC Twente (women) players
SC Heerenveen (women) players
PEC Zwolle (women) players
Women's association football forwards
FIFA Century Club
Footballers from Groningen (province)